The Connecticut Senate election, 1920 was held on November 2, 1920 to elect all 35 Senators to the Connecticut State Senate for the term which began in January 1921 and ended in January 1923. It occurred on the same date as other federal and state elections, including the state's gubernatorial election.

The election saw 34 Republicans win election or re-election, and 1 Democrat win election. 10 seats flipped from Democratic to Republican.

Results
Results of the 1920 Connecticut Senate election. Party shading denotes winner of Senate seat.

Notes
1 Wife of Hiram Percy Maxim.
2 Includes West Haven, in 1920 it was a borough of Orange
3 Today known as Deep River.

References

1920 Connecticut elections
C
1920